The 2019 Italian Basketball Cup, known as the 2018 PosteMobile Final Eight for sponsorship reasons, was the 51st edition of Italy's national cup tournament. The competition is managed by the Lega Basket for LBA clubs. The tournament was played from 14 to 17 February 2019 in Florence, at the end of the first half of the 2018–19 LBA season.

Fiat Torino were the defending champions.

Vanoli Cremona went to win its first Cup ever by beating New Basket Brindisi 83–74 in the Finals. Drew Crawford was named Panasonic MVP of the competition.

Qualification
Qualified for the tournament were selected based on their position on the league table at the end of the first half of the 2018–19 LBA regular season.

Bracket

Quarterfinals

Vanoli Cremona vs. Openjobmetis Varese

AX Armani Exchange Milano vs. Segafredo Virtus Bologna

Umana Reyer Venezia vs. Banco di Sardegna Sassari

Sidigas Avellino vs. New Basket Brindisi

Semifinals

Vanoli Cremona vs. Segafredo Virtus Bologna

Banco di Sardegna Sassari vs. New Basket Brindisi

Final

Vanoli Cremona vs. New Basket Brindisi

Sponsors

Source:

References

External links
LBA Final Eight official website

2018–19 in Italian basketball
21st century in Florence
Italian Basketball Cup
Italian Basketball Cup